Satlok Ashram is an organisation founded by Bhakti Mukti Trust in June 1, 1999 in Karontha village of Rohtak, Haryana. The first spiritual program took place from 1 June to 7 June 1999.

History 
In 1994, Ramdevanand Maharaj (a Hindu saint from Garib Das Panth) selected Rampal as his successor. Rampal started delivering discourses and giving initiation to the devotees

Earlier Rampal used to impart Satsang by going to the house of the devotees. As the number of devotees increased there arose a need to establish an Ashram. Satlok Ashram Karontha was, hence, established by Bandi Chhod Bhakti Mukti Trust in 1999.

Karontha incident 2006 
In 2006, Rampal raised objections to certain parts of Satyarth Prakash, the central text of the Arya Samaj religious sect. He termed these parts as "impractical and anti-social". This angered the followers of Arya Samaj, who surrounded his ashram, eventually resulting in a clash between the followers of two sects on 12 July 2006. During the clash, one person was shot dead and 59 more were injured. Rampal was charged with murder and attempted murder, and jailed for 21 months. His followers claim that he was falsely implicated in the case and demanded a CBI investigation. Rampal was forced to vacate the Karontha ashram.
He was convicted of murder in this case relating to the death of a woman supporter.

Barwala incident 2014 
In 2014, the Punjab and Haryana High Court issued non-bailable arrest warrants against him after his followers were alleged of disrupting court's proceedings. Police went to detain him on 12 November 2014.

By 18 November, his Satlok ashram in Hisar was protected by thousands of his followers who were holding flags reading 'Satsaheb'. More than 20,000 security personnel and police forced their way into the ashram, but they could not find Rampal for arrest. The police used earth movers to break wall on the rear side of ashram to find him but were opposed by a large number of followers who allegedly injured some police personnel in an effort to halt their entry. The bodies of five women and 18-month-old child were found in his ashram.

Rampal was arrested on the night of 19 November 2014, along with more than 900 of his followers, on charges including sedition, murder, attempt to murder, conspiracy, hoarding illegal weapons and aiding and abetting suicide-mongers. Rampal was acquitted of the charges of wrongful confinement in court on 29 August. On 11 October 2018, Rampal was found guilty of murder in two cases with FIR no. 429 and 430 relating to the 2014 incident. Both cases pertain to the death of five women and an eighteen-month-old infant at his Satlok Ashram in Barwala, Hisar.

References 


Ashrams